William Leonard (14 February 1887 – 14 October 1969) was a Labour and Co-operative politician in Scotland. He served as the member of parliament for Glasgow St. Rollox from 1931 to 1950.

The St. Rollox constituency was abolished for the 1950 general election. He contested the new Glasgow Woodside constituency, where he lost by 1,109 votes to the Unionist Party candidate. He did not stand in 1951.

References

External links 
 

1887 births
1969 deaths
Members of the Parliament of the United Kingdom for Glasgow constituencies
UK MPs 1929–1931
UK MPs 1931–1935
UK MPs 1935–1945
UK MPs 1945–1950
Labour Co-operative MPs for Scottish constituencies
Ministers in the Attlee governments, 1945–1951
Parliamentary Peace Aims Group